Talisman is an album by the New Zealand musician Alastair Galbraith, released in 1995.

Critical reception
Trouser Press called the album "a meandering, scattershot affair that displays little evidence of [Galbraith's] former songwriting acumen."

Track listing
 "Talisman" - 01:15
 "Yuhahi" - 01:46
 "Carlos" - 01:22
 "Xtra I" - 00:45
 "Black Flame" - 03:47
 "Waits" - 00:36
 "Water In My Ears" - 00:57
 "Anais" - 03:18
 "Cemetery Ragga" - 02:07
 "Welfare Child" - 01:35
 "Mrs. Meggary" - 03:37
 "I'm Rich" - 01:10
 "P.D. Lyte" - 02:22
 "Policemen On Ether" - 01:50
 "Coast Road" - 01:11
 "Allone" - 01:45
 "Lucid Branches" - 02:05
 "Strong Enough" - 01:54
 "Coded" - 02:00
 "Seamed" - 03:07

References

1995 albums
Alastair Galbraith (musician) albums